Daniel William Hubbs (born January 23, 1971) is an American baseball coach and former player. He was the head coach of the USC Trojans baseball team from February 13, 2013 to May 29, 2019. He was previously an assistant coach at USC and was the pitching coach for the California Golden Bears from 2000 to 2011.

Hubbs played college baseball at USC and played minor league baseball in the Los Angeles Dodgers and Philadelphia Phillies organizations.

Head coaching records
Below is a table of Hubbs's yearly records as an NCAA head baseball coach.

References

External links

USC Trojans bio
California Golden Bears bio

1971 births
Living people
USC Trojans baseball players
Great Falls Dodgers players
Bakersfield Dodgers players
San Antonio Missions players
Albuquerque Dukes players
Reading Phillies players
California Golden Bears baseball coaches
USC Trojans baseball coaches